Trygve Løken (9 September 1898 – 19 August 1955) was a Norwegian footballer. He played in one match for the Norway national football team in 1927.

References

External links
 

1898 births
1955 deaths
Norwegian footballers
Norway international footballers
Place of birth missing
Association footballers not categorized by position